Ctirad Ovčáčík (born 18 October 1984, in Ostrava) is a Czech professional ice hockey defenceman. He played with HC Vítkovice in the Czech Extraliga during the 2010–11 Czech Extraliga season.

References

External links

1984 births
Czech ice hockey defencemen
HC Vítkovice players
Living people
Sportspeople from Ostrava
HC Košice players
Czech expatriate ice hockey players in Slovakia